Thwaite St Mary is a rural village (and civil parish) in the English county of Norfolk, it sits just a few miles north of the Suffolk border. Thwaite – sometimes pronounced ‘twayt’ by locals – has approximately thirty-five dwellings and a population of around seventy-nine. The population is included in the civil parish of Hedenham.

The name Thwaite means 'Clearing'.

Due to its rural location and minimal air and light pollution, Thwaite is home to an astronomical observatory run by the University of East Anglia. The village also backs on to the tiny Seething Airfield, formerly RAF Seething which utilises part of the runway from an old American wartime airbase. The 1941 control tower still stands and serves as a museum to the war years and to the 448th Bombardment Group (Heavy) in particular. Its unchanged control tower and the fact that it is still an active airfield means that Seething is often used as a location for wartime-themed charity events and air-days. It is also one of the staging posts for the popular Lowestoft summer air-show.

The community in Thwaite is active in organising social and fund-raising events. These events regularly draw a crowd from the wider South-Norfolk and Suffolk area. Together with the appearance of the village and its position in the picturesque Norfolk/Suffolk-borders countryside, this social cohesion contributes to a reputation as a highly desirable place to live.

St Mary's Church
Thwaite's church of St Mary has an active congregation, and also draws attendees from outside the parish, families who have once lived in the village sometimes return to use this pretty church for weddings and memorial services. The original church was founded in 1385.

Architecture
Its well-kept churchyard and striking Norman arch doorway attract sightseers from the wider area too. Families who have once lived in the village sometimes return to use this pretty church for weddings and memorial services. The 14th-century square tower replaced a round one, and curiously the north side of the church has not a single window. The brick porch was added in the 18th century, the church was partly rebuilt of brick in 1738.

The church is entirely rustic in character. The only medieval survival is the 15th-century font, which is completely plain. However, the stem is similar to that of those in several other churches round about. The chancel is simple and elegant; the screen is a nice simple Georgian piece which must be contemporary with the rebuilding. The glass in the east window was restored after being blown out by a stray bomb during the Second World War.

References

Tourist attractions in Norfolk
Civil parishes in Norfolk
South Norfolk